Rodovia Assis Chateubriand (officially designated SP-425) is a highway in the state of São Paulo, Brazil. Its name honours the Brazilian journalist and press tycoon, Assis Chateaubriand, owner of Diários Associados.

The highway, which is single-lane in most of its length, crosses the state in the northeast–southwest direction. It starts in the city of Guaíra, and passes through Barretos, Olímpia and São José do Rio Preto, where it interconnects with the Rodovia Transbrasiliana (BR-153). The traject continues to Presidente Prudente, passing through Penápolis and Martinópolis.

It is managed and maintained by the Department of Roads of the State of São Paulo. Toll is not required.

See also
 Highway system of São Paulo
 Brazilian Highway System

Highways in São Paulo (state)